The Pine Canyon Caldera Complex is a  caldera complex located in Big Bend National Park of Texas. The complex is located in the southern part of the Chisos Mountains in the South Rim Formation. The caldera was formed by several rhyolitic eruptions about 32 million years ago. It is considered a downsag caldera (a type of collapsed caldera), meaning it lacks surficial faulting. The Pine Canyon Caldera also is believed to have been created from crustal stretching during the Ouachita orogeny. Also in the northern part of the caldera, high magnetic waves are present and are believed to be from a broad intrusion, which tends to mean a partial crustal boundary of the Ouachita orogeny. This feature represents the largest intrusion, (thick,  in volume) in an area where laccoliths are ubiquitous in nature. This intrusion may represent a long-lived magma chamber (1 m.y.) that was replenished by smaller batches of magma that varied in viscosity.

References

Big Bend National Park
Calderas of Texas
Volcanoes of Texas
Oligocene calderas